Adenopeltis is a plant genus of the family Euphorbiaceae first described as a genus in 1832. Its name comes from Greek and means "glandular shield". It contains only one known species, Adenopeltis serrata, endemic to the central part of the Republic of Chile in South America.

References

Hippomaneae
Endemic flora of Chile
Monotypic Euphorbiaceae genera